Alina Ionescu Marshall (born October 1, 1977) is an American lawyer who serves as a judge of the United States Tax Court.

Education 

Marshall earned her Bachelor of Arts, cum laude, from Yale University and her Juris Doctor, cum laude, from the University of Pennsylvania Law School, where she served as an Editor of the University of Pennsylvania Law Review and was inducted into the Order of the Coif.

Career 

Marshall practiced tax law at West & Feinberg and Freshfields Bruckhaus Deringer and served as a law clerk to a Judge of the United States Tax Court. Marshall has also served as an adjunct professor of law at Georgetown University Law Center in its Graduate Tax Program. Before becoming a judge, she was Counsel to the Chief Judge of the United States Tax Court.

United States Tax Court service 

On November 6, 2019, President Donald Trump announced his intent to nominate Marshall to serve as a judge of the United States Tax Court. On November 19, 2019, her nomination was sent to the Senate. President Trump nominated Marshall to the seat vacated by Judge L. Paige Marvel, who took senior status on December 6, 2019. On August 13, 2020, the United States Senate confirmed her nomination by voice vote. She was sworn into office on August 24, 2020.

References

External links 

1977 births
Living people
21st-century American women lawyers
21st-century American lawyers
21st-century American judges
21st-century American women judges
American people of Romanian descent
Georgetown University Law Center faculty
Judges of the United States Tax Court
Lawyers from Washington, D.C.
United States Article I federal judges appointed by Donald Trump
University of Pennsylvania Law School alumni
Yale University alumni